Benjamin Tod Flippo (born November 11, 1990), is an American singer-songwriter. He is lead singer and guitarist for the Lost Dog Street Band with his wife Ashley Mae (vocals, fiddle) and Jeff Loops (bass). The band has released several albums through crowdfunding platforms, with their album Weight of a Trigger reaching number five on the Billboard Bluegrass Albums chart in 2019.

Biography

Early life 
Tod grew up in Cottontown, Tennessee. He received his first guitar from his mother at the age of seven, but did not learn how to play until he was given a Fullerton Parlour guitar by a friend's father, at fourteen.  The same year, he was expelled from school. Tod began hopping freight trains as a way to see the country.

Lost Dog Street Band 
After being part of a music group called Barefoot Surrender, Tod and bandmate Ashley Mae formed the Lost Dog Street Band in 2010, named after their yellow Labrador, Daisy. Tod would do guitar and vocals while Mae would play the fiddle.

Tod and Mae met Nicholas and Shannon Jae Ridout. The two couples formed the street-quartet, Spitshine, and began touring together. In 2013 Nicholas Ridout committed suicide and Tod and Mae rekindled Lost Dog Street Band. The band has crowdfunded multiple album through Indiegogo and Kickstarter, as well as self-publishing their music videos on the YouTube channel GemsOnVHS. Lost Dog Street Band toured and released their fifth studio album Weight of a Trigger in 2019, and in April of that year, the album reached number five on the Billboard Bluegrass Album chart.

Solo career 
In 2017, Tod released the solo album I Will Rise which was recorded with "two mics and no overdubbing." In early 2019, Tod announced his second solo album, A Heart of Gold is Hard to Find, which was released November 22, 2019. In June 2022, Tod announced his third solo album, Songs I Swore I'd Never Sing, which was released September 23, 2022.

Personal life 
Tod met his wife Ashley Mae when they were teenagers. While she was in college he busked and hopped trains to earn money. The couple has a homestead in Kentucky.

Discography

as Lost Dog Street Band 
 Sick Pup (2011)
 Life's a Dog-gone Shame (2013)
 Homeward Bound (2015)
 Rage and Tragedy (2016)
 Weight of a Trigger (2019)
 The Magnolia Sessions (2021)
 Glory (2022)

Solo albums 
 I Will Rise (2017)
 A Heart of Gold Is Hard to Find (2019)
  Songs I Swore I'd Never Sing (2022)

References

External links
 

Living people
People from Sumner County, Tennessee
American male singer-songwriters
21st-century American singers
21st-century American guitarists
American male guitarists
American country guitarists
American country singer-songwriters
Guitarists from Tennessee
Country musicians from Tennessee
Singer-songwriters from Tennessee
21st-century American male singers
1990 births